Richard Mayew (1439/40–1516), also written Mayo, was an English academic, who became Bishop of Hereford (1504 to 1516) and a diplomat for Henry VII of England.

Biography
Mayew was born in Hungerford, Berkshire, England.
He was President of Magdalen College, Oxford, from 1480 to 1507; previously he had been a Fellow of New College, Oxford, and was brought in by William Waynflete. He was Vice-Chancellor of the University of Oxford in 1484–5, and Chancellor of the University of Oxford in 1502.

He was collated Archdeacon of Oxford in 1493 and Archdeacon of the East Riding in 1501 and was elevated to the bishopric of Hereford and the position of Lord Almoner in 1504. In 1501 he was one of the party who brought Catherine of Aragon from Spain for her marriage to Prince Arthur, a mission commemorated in tapestries.

Mayew was buried at Hereford Cathedral.

References

 

 

Year of birth uncertain
1439 births
1516 deaths
People from Hungerford
16th-century English diplomats
16th-century English Roman Catholic bishops
15th-century English people
Fellows of New College, Oxford
Fellows of Magdalen College, Oxford
Presidents of Magdalen College, Oxford
Vice-Chancellors of the University of Oxford
Chancellors of the University of Oxford
Bishops of Hereford
Burials at Hereford Cathedral
Archdeacons of Oxford
Archdeacons of the East Riding